Ahmadreza Abedzadeh (born 25 May 1966) is an Iranian former footballer who played as a goalkeeper. He played for Esteghlal, Sepahan, Persepolis and the Iranian national team. He made 79 appearances for Iran and U.S.A , and played for his country at the 1998 FIFA World Cup.

Club career
Abedzadeh had an unbeaten record in the Tehran derby with 13 matches, 7 wins and 6 draws. While playing for Persepolis, he went 802 consecutive minutes without conceding a goal.

International career
Abedzadeh was called up at the age of 18 for the Iran national under-20 football team in 1984. After his good shows, he was invited to the senior team in 1987 by then-manager Parviz Dehdari. Abedzadeh made his debut in the match against Kuwait on 27 February 1987, in which he conceded a goal in a 2–1 victory. He started in the 1990 Asian Games, where they won the gold medal after defeating North Korea in the final and Abedzadeh saved two penalties. At the tournament, he conceded only two goals which were both scored from penalty kicks.

Iran defeated Australia in the FIFA World Cup qualification play-offs to reach 1998 FIFA World Cup, their second participation in the World Cup and first since 1978. He missed the first match at the World Cup against Yugoslavia due to injury, then captained Iran at the next two matches against United States and Germany. Iran finished third at their group and Abedzadeh announced his retirement from international football after the final match.

Post-playing career

Abedzadeh suffered a stroke in 2001 and that was the point in which he let go of professional football. He was released some weeks later, but required a number of surgeries after, and even to this day, has side effects from his stroke. Abedzadeh suffered again on 11 March 2007 when his mother died.

He has also been the goalkeeping coach for many clubs after retiring from playing football. He coached Saipa in 2001, Esteghlal Ahvaz in 2005, Persepolis from 2008 to 2009, Steel Azin in 2010 and Los Angeles Blues from 2011 to 2012.

Legacy
Dubbed the Eagle of Asia for his ability to protect the net, Abedzadeh's international career stretched for 11 years. In 2009, he was named in a poll as Iran's favorite player of last 30 years. His goalkeeping legacy in Iran is rivaled only by Nasser Hejazi.

Personal life
Abedzadeh married in 1988 and has one daughter, Negar, and one son, Amir, who is also a goalkeeper and plays for SD Ponferradina and the Iran national team. Abedzadeh also runs a restaurant in Motelghoo, one of the cities of Northern Iran.

Honours

Club
Esteghlal
Iranian Football League: 1989–90
Asian Club Championship: 1990–91, runner up: 1991

Persepolis
Iranian Football League: 1995–96, 1996–97, 1998–99, 1999–2000
Hazfi Cup: 1998–99

National
Iran
Asian Games Gold Medal: 1990

References

External links 
RSSSF archive of Ahmad Reza Abedzadeh's international appearances

1966 births
Iranian footballers
Iran international footballers
Association football goalkeepers
1988 AFC Asian Cup players
1992 AFC Asian Cup players
1996 AFC Asian Cup players
1998 FIFA World Cup players
Esteghlal F.C. players
Sepahan S.C. footballers
Persepolis F.C. players
Persepolis F.C. non-playing staff
People from Abadan, Iran
Living people
Asian Games gold medalists for Iran
Asian Games medalists in football
Footballers at the 1990 Asian Games
Iranian restaurateurs
Association football goalkeeping coaches
Medalists at the 1990 Asian Games
Sportspeople from Khuzestan province